The 1979 UK Athletics Championships was the national championship in outdoor track and field for the United Kingdom held at Alexander Stadium, Birmingham.

It was the third edition of the competition limited to British athletes only, launched as an alternative to the AAA Championships, which was open to foreign competitors. However, due to the fact that the calibre of national competition remained greater at the AAA event, the UK Championships this year were not considered the principal national championship event by some statisticians, such as the National Union of Track Statisticians (NUTS). Many of the athletes below also competed at the 1979 AAA Championships.

Two athletes claimed a third straight title: Geoff Capes in the men's shot put and Meg Ritchie in the discus throw. Athletes to claim a second consecutive UK title were David Black (10,000 m), Chris Black (hammer throw), David Ottley (javelin throw), and Sue Reeve (long jump). Heather Hunte won her first titles in the 100 metres and 200 metres, beating out Kathy Smallwood and Beverley Goddard in both events.

The main international track and field competition for the United Kingdom that year was the 1979 European Cup. The secondary status of the UK event at national level was indicated by the fact that the six individual medallists at the European competition were all absent from the championships in Birmingham. Several of the European women's relay medallists did compete however, including Hunte, Smallwood and Joslyn Hoyte-Smith.

Medal summary

Men

Women

References

UK Athletics Championships
UK Outdoor Championships
Athletics Outdoor
Sports competitions in Birmingham, West Midlands
Athletics competitions in England